Aloeides, commonly called coppers, is a genus of butterflies in the family Lycaenidae. Most can be found in South Africa (49 species), but a few species occur as far north as Kenya (8 species).

Species
Listed alphabetically within groups.

The "thyra" species group:
Aloeides apicalis Tite & Dickson, 1968 – pointed copper
Aloeides arida Tite & Dickson, 1968 – arid copper
Aloeides bamptoni Tite & Dickson, 1977 – Brampton's copper
Aloeides braueri Tite & Dickson, 1968 – Brauer's copper
Aloeides caledoni Tite & Dickson, 1973 – Caledon copper
Aloeides clarki Tite & Dickson, 1968 – Coega copper
Aloeides dentatis (Swierstra, 1909) – Roodepoort copper
Aloeides depicta Tite & Dickson, 1968 – depicta copper
Aloeides dryas Tite & Dickson, 1968 – Transvaal copper
Aloeides egerides Tite & Dickson, 1968 – Red Hill copper
Aloeides gowani Tite & Dickson, 1968 – Gowan's copper
Aloeides juana Tite & Dickson, 1968 – Juana copper
Aloeides kaplani Tite & Dickson, 1977 – Kaplan's copper
Aloeides lutescens Tite & Dickson, 1968 – Worcester copper
Aloeides margaretae Tite & Dickson, 1968 – Margarite's copper
Aloeides nollothi Tite & Dickson, 1977 – Nolloth's copper
Aloeides oreas Tite & Dickson, 1968 – Oreas copper
Aloeides pallida Tite & Dickson, 1968 – giant copper
Aloeides penningtoni Tite & Dickson, 1968 – Pennington's copper
Aloeides pringlei Tite & Dickson, 1976 – Pringle's copper
Aloeides quickelbergei Tite & Dickson, 1968 – Quickelberge's copper
Aloeides rileyi Tite & Dickson, 1976 – Riley's copper
Aloeides simplex (Trimen, 1893) – dune copper
Aloeides thyra (Linnaeus, 1764) – red copper
Aloeides vansoni Tite & Dickson, 1968 – Van Son's copper
unnamed species group A:
Aloeides almeida (C. Felder, 1862) – Almeida copper
Aloeides aranda (Wallengren, 1857) – Aranda copper
Aloeides barklyi (Trimen, 1874) – Barkly's copper
Aloeides conradsi (Aurivillius, 1907) – Conrad's copper
Aloeides damarensis (Trimen, 1891) – Damara copper
Aloeides griseus Riley, 1921
Aloeides henningi Tite & Dickson, 1973 – Henning's copper
Aloeides macmasteri Tite & Dickson, 1973 – McMaster's copper
Aloeides molomo (Trimen, 1870) – molomo copper
Aloeides pierus (Cramer, [1779]) – dull copper
Aloeides plowesi Tite & Dickson, 1973 – Plowes' copper
Aloeides stevensoni Tite & Dickson, 1973 – Stevenson's copper
Aloeides susanae Tite & Dickson, 1973 – Susan's copper
Aloeides swanepoeli Tite & Dickson, 1973 – Swanepoel's copper
Aloeides taikosama (Wallengren, 1857) – dusky copper
Aloeides trimeni Tite & Dickson, 1973 – Trimen's copper
unnamed species group B:
Aloeides angolensis Tite & Dickson, 1973
Aloeides argenteus Henning & Henning, 1994 – silvery copper
Aloeides barbarae Henning & Henning, 1994 – Barbara's copper
Aloeides caffrariae Henning, 1987 – border copper
Aloeides carolynnae Dickson, 1983 – Carolynn's copper
Aloeides dicksoni Henning, 1987 – Diskson's copper
Aloeides maluti Pringle, 1983 – Maluti copper
Aloeides mbuluensis Pringle, 1994 – Mbulu copper
Aloeides merces Henning & Henning, 1986 – Wakkerstroom copper
Aloeides monticola Pringle, 1994 – Cederberg copper
Aloeides mullini Henning & Henning, 1996 – Mullin's copper
Aloeides namibiensis Henning & Henning, 1994 – Namibia copper
Aloeides nubilus Henning & Henning, 1982 – cloud copper
Aloeides rossouwi Henning & Henning, 1982 – Rossouw's copper
Aloeides tearei Henning & Henning, 1982 – Teare's copper
Aloeides titei Henning, 1987 – Tite's copper

References

External links

 
Lycaenidae genera
Taxa named by Jacob Hübner
Taxonomy articles created by Polbot